{{DISPLAYTITLE:NZR BC class}}

The BC class comprised a single steam locomotive that operated on New Zealand's national rail network.  Built for the Wellington and Manawatu Railway (WMR) and classified simply as No.17, it passed into the ownership of the New Zealand Railways Department (NZR) when the government purchased the WMR in December 1908, and it was then that it acquired the BC classification as BC 463.

Introduction 
The WMR ordered No.17 from the Baldwin Locomotive Works. It entered service on 10 June 1902 and was at the time the most powerful locomotive to operate in the country. No.17 was the only 2-8-2 "Mikado" to run in New Zealand. It was a Vauclain compound, and its trailing truck bore similarities to the Q class, the world's first 4-6-2 "Pacific" type then under construction by Baldwin for NZR.

The locomotive was designed to haul trains on the WMR's steep main line between Wellington and Paekakariki, and it proved capable of hauling a 280-ton freight train up the steep grades. This line became the southern portion of the North Island Main Trunk Railway when acquired by NZR in 1908.

Withdrawal 
No.17/BC 463 worked this line its entire life. It operated for nearly two decades in NZR's ownership until it was withdrawn on 31 March 1927 along with fellow surviving WMR locomotives when NZR adopted a rapid locomotive standardisation plan in the 1920s. It did not survive to be preserved. A decade after it was withdrawn, the steepest section of its former line was bypassed by the Tawa Flat deviation and became the Johnsonville Branch.

References

Bibliography

External links 
 New Zealand Steam - BC class

Individual locomotives of New Zealand
Bc class
2-8-2 locomotives
Baldwin locomotives
Vauclain compound locomotives
Scrapped locomotives
Railway locomotives introduced in 1901